Eden Rainbow-Cooper (born 17 May 2001) is an elite English Paralympic athlete from Portsmouth. Rainbow-Cooper is a T54 athlete who competes as a wheelchair racer.

She was born with sacral agenesis. Rainbow-Cooper began wheelchair racing in 2013 and is part of Weir Archer Academy. In the 2022 Commonwealth Games, she won a silver medal in the marathon (T54) event. She went on to come first in London's Big Half, equalling Manuela Schär’s course record for the women's wheelchair race. In September 2022, she won the women's wheelchair race in the Great North Run.

References

2001 births
Living people
English female wheelchair racers
Commonwealth Games silver medallists for England
Commonwealth Games medallists in athletics
Athletes (track and field) at the 2022 Commonwealth Games
21st-century English women
Sportspeople from Portsmouth
Medallists at the 2022 Commonwealth Games